Armand Dupree is a  direct selling company based in the United States, owned by Tupperware Brands. The brand has been known in Mexico for over 28 years, and was sold by the Fuller Cosmeticos company there.

Products 
Armand Dupree products can be found in personal care, cosmetics, fragrances, skin care, and home care categories. Armand Dupree products were first sold in Mexico, but can now be found in Argentina, Brazil, Philippines, United States, and Uruguay.

References

External links 
Tupperware Brands

Companies based in Orlando, Florida